André Hennicke (born 21 September 1958) is a German actor. He has appeared in more than one hundred films since 1984.

Hennicke was born in Johanngeorgenstadt in Saxony. He was awarded a German television award for best actor for Something to Remind Me in 2002. He has appeared in the 2004 film Downfall as SS General Wilhelm Mohnke, 2005's Sophie Scholl – The Final Days as infamous Nazi judge Roland Freisler,  and the 2005 docudrama Speer und Er as Nazi leader Rudolf Hess. In 2009, he appeared as one of the primary antagonists in science-fiction thriller Pandorum, portraying the leader of a group of genetically mutated human-hybrids. In 2015 in Buddha's Little Finger plays role of Vasily Chapayev.

Selected filmography

References

External links

 

1959 births
Living people
People from Erzgebirgskreis
German male film actors
German male television actors
20th-century German male actors
21st-century German male actors